Several ships of the Royal Navy have borne the name HMS Forth, after the River Forth:

HMS Forth was to have been a 36-gun fifth rate, but she was renamed  in 1812 before being launched in 1813.
 was a 50-gun fifth rate launched in 1813 and broken up in 1819.
 was a 44-gun fifth rate launched in 1833. She was converted to a screw frigate and undocked in 1856. She became a coal hulk in 1869 and was renamed HMS Jupiter, before being sold in 1883.
 was a  launched in 1886. She was to have been renamed HMS Howard in 1920, but this did not happen and she was sold in 1921.
 was a submarine depot ship launched in 1938. She was renamed HMS Defiance between 1972 and 1978 and was sold for scrapping in 1985.
 is the first of five new Batch 2 s. She was commissioned in 2018.

References

Royal Navy ship names